Soulburner is the second album by Swedish melodic death metal band Gardenian.  It would be their first album under the Nuclear Blast banner. This is the last Gardenian release with Håkan Skoger.

Track listing
 "As a True King" – 3:21
 "Powertool" – 4:38
 "Deserted" – 2:58
 "Soulburner" – 4:09
 "If Tomorrow's Gone" – 4:37
 "Small Electric Space" – 5:25
 "Chaos in Flesh" – 4:09
 "Ecstasy of Life" – 3:43
 "Tell the World I'm Sorry" – 5:44
 "Loss" – 2:13
 "Black Days" – 6:26

Credits

Gardenian
Jim Kjell – vocals, guitars
Niklas Engelin – guitars
Håkan Skoger – bass
Thim Blom – drums

Guests
Eric Hawk – clean vocals
Sabrina Khilstrand – clean vocals
Thomas Fredriksson – Keyboards

Gardenian albums
1999 albums
Nuclear Blast albums